The Tridente-class submarines, also designated as U 209PN, are diesel-electric submarines based on the Type 214 submarine developed by Howaldtswerke-Deutsche Werft GmbH (HDW) for the Portuguese Navy.

Originally, HDW proposed the Type 209 submarine (U-209) during the competition, but decided to later enter a new proposal based on the Type 214. It is for this reason that the Tridente class is commonly designated as the U 209PN.

The class and its ships are the first to not be named after marine animals, thus breaking a tradition retracing back to 1913, when the first submarine entered service with the Portuguese Navy.

Ships
The Tridente-class submarines are wrongly classed in the "diesel-electric" class. Their propulsion is exclusively electric, with electric motors powered by batteries. These batteries may be charged while submerged by "fuel-cells" (inverse electrolysis) for which, this submarine carries a huge supply of liquid oxygen and hydrogen. Also, and solely as a second solution for recharging the batteries, this submarine carries two powerful diesel-electric generators (1,000 KVA) for use only when surfaced, or at snorkel depth.

Submerged, from Lisbon, Portugal, submarines of the class may reach the Cape of Good Hope and return, in 15 days.

Image gallery

External links

 Tridente class information at the Portuguese Navy website (in Portuguese)
 209PN profile at the Portuguese Navy website (in Portuguese)
 Submarino de ataque (SSK) classe Tridente (tipo U-214) - Área Militar (in Portuguese)
 Acquisition history of the U-209PN class (in Portuguese)
 Article about the differences between the U209, U212, U214 and U209PN (in Portuguese)

Attack submarines
Submarine classes
Submarines of the Portuguese Navy
Type 214 submarines